In Greek mythology, Antinous (also Antinoüs) or Antinoös ( means "opposite in character, resisting") may refer to the following personages:

 Antinous, a Trojan prince as one of the sons of King Priam of Troy by an unknown woman.
 Antinous, son of Eupeithes and one of the Suitors of Penelope, wife of the hero Odysseus.

Note

References 

 Apollodorus, The Library with an English Translation by Sir James George Frazer, F.B.A., F.R.S. in 2 Volumes, Cambridge, MA, Harvard University Press; London, William Heinemann Ltd. 1921. ISBN 0-674-99135-4. Online version at the Perseus Digital Library. Greek text available from the same website.
 Gaius Julius Hyginus, Fabulae from The Myths of Hyginus translated and edited by Mary Grant. University of Kansas Publications in Humanistic Studies. Online version at the Topos Text Project.
 Homer, The Odyssey with an English Translation by A.T. Murray, PH.D. in two volumes. Cambridge, MA., Harvard University Press; London, William Heinemann, Ltd. 1919. . Online version at the Perseus Digital Library. Greek text available from the same website.

Princes in Greek mythology
Trojans